Liu Xiao may refer to:

 Liu Xiao (diplomat) (1908–1988), Chinese diplomat
 Liu Xiao (fencer) (born 1987), Chinese fencer
 Liu Xiao (long jumper), Chinese long jump athlete